Beltrame is an Italian name. It may refer to:
Beltrame, a traditional character of the Italian commedia dell'arte
Arnaud Beltrame, a lieutenant colonel in the French National Gendarmerie, killed during hostage crisis
Beltrame di Milano, pen name of Niccolò Barbieri, an Italian actor and writer 
Beltrame Feragut, a French composer
Daniel Beltrame, an Australian footballer
Fabiana Beltrame, a Brazilian rower
Fabiano Beltrame, a Brazilian footballer
Francisco Beltrame, a Uruguayan architect and minister
Marco Beltrame, an Italian Baroque sculptor
Marco Beltrame, an Italian ski jumper
Séverine Brémond Beltrame, a French tennis player 
Stefano Beltrame, an Italian footballer
Wesley Lopes Beltrame, a Brazilian footballer